There are three known stable isotopes of oxygen (8O): , , and .

List of isotopes

|-
| 
| style="text-align:right" | 8
| style="text-align:right" | 3
| 
| []
| 2p
| 
| (3/2−)
|
|
|-
| 
| style="text-align:right" | 8
| style="text-align:right" | 4
| 
| 
| 2p
| 
| 0+
| 
| 
|-
| rowspan=2|
| rowspan=2 style="text-align:right" | 8
| rowspan=2 style="text-align:right" | 5
| rowspan=2|
| rowspan=2|
| β+
| 
| rowspan=2|(3/2−)
| rowspan=2|
| rowspan=2|
|-
| β+p
| 
|-
| 
| style="text-align:right" | 8
| style="text-align:right" | 6
| 
| 
| β+
| 
| 0+
|
|
|-
| 
| style="text-align:right" | 8
| style="text-align:right" | 7
| 
| 
| β+
| 
| 1/2−
|
|
|-
| 
| style="text-align:right" | 8
| style="text-align:right" | 8
| 
| colspan="3" style="text-align:center;"|Stable
| 0+
| colspan="2" style="text-align:center;"|[, ]
|-
| 
| style="text-align:right" | 8
| style="text-align:right" | 9
| 
| colspan="3" style="text-align:center;"|Stable
| 5/2+
| colspan="2" style="text-align:center;"|[, ]
|-
| 
| style="text-align:right" | 8
| style="text-align:right" | 10
| 
| colspan="3" style="text-align:center;"|Stable
| 0+
| colspan="2" style="text-align:center;"|[, ]
|-
| 
| style="text-align:right" | 8
| style="text-align:right" | 11
| 
| 
| β−
| 
| 5/2+
|
|
|-
| 
| style="text-align:right" | 8
| style="text-align:right" | 12
| 
| 
| β−
| 
| 0+
|
|
|-
| rowspan=2|
| rowspan=2 style="text-align:right" | 8
| rowspan=2 style="text-align:right" | 13
| rowspan=2|
| rowspan=2|
| β−
| 
| rowspan=2|(5/2+)
| rowspan=2|
| rowspan=2|
|-
| β−n ?
|  ?
|-
| rowspan=2|
| rowspan=2 style="text-align:right" | 8
| rowspan=2 style="text-align:right" | 14
| rowspan=2|
| rowspan=2|
| β− (> )
| 
| rowspan=2|0+
| rowspan=2|
| rowspan=2|
|-
| β−n (< )
| 
|-
| rowspan=2|
| rowspan=2 style="text-align:right" | 8
| rowspan=2 style="text-align:right" | 15
| rowspan=2|
| rowspan=2|
| β−
| 
| rowspan=2|1/2+
| rowspan=2|
| rowspan=2|
|-
| β−n
| 
|-
| rowspan=2|
| rowspan=2 style="text-align:right" | 8
| rowspan=2 style="text-align:right" | 16
| rowspan=2|
| rowspan=2|
| β−
| 
| rowspan=2|0+
| rowspan=2|
| rowspan=2|
|-
| β−n
| 
|-
| 
| style="text-align:right" | 8
| style="text-align:right" | 17
| 
| 
| n
| 
| 3/2+
|
|
|-
| 
| style="text-align:right" | 8
| style="text-align:right" | 18
| 
| 
| 2n
| 
| 0+
|
|

Stable isotopes 

Depending on the terrestrial source, the standard atomic weight varies within the range of [, ] (the conventional value is 15.999).

 has high relative and absolute abundance because it is a principal product of stellar evolution and because it is a primary isotope, meaning it can be made by stars that were initially hydrogen only. Most  is synthesized at the end of the helium fusion process in stars; the triple-alpha process creates , which captures an additional  nucleus to produce . The neon burning process creates additional .

Most  is produced when  (made abundant from CNO burning) captures a  nucleus, becoming . This quickly (half life around 110 minutes) beta decays to  making that isotope common in the helium-rich zones of stars. About 109 kelvin is needed to fuse oxygen into sulfur.

Since physicists referred to  only, while chemists meant the natural mix of isotopes, this led to slightly different mass scales.

Applications of various isotopes
Measurements of 18O/16O ratio are often used to interpret changes in paleoclimate. Water molecules with a lighter isotope are slightly more likely to evaporate and less likely to fall as precipitation, so Earth's freshwater and polar ice have slightly less  than air or seawater. This disparity allows analysis of temperature patterns via historic ice cores.

Solid samples (organic and inorganic) for oxygen isotopic ratios are usually stored in silver cups and measured with pyrolysis and mass spectrometry. Researchers need to avoid improper or prolonged storage of the samples for accurate measurements.

Due to natural oxygen being mostly , samples enriched with the other stable isotopes can be used for isotope labeling.

While this effect can also be observed in light water reactors, ordinary hydrogen (protium) has a higher absorption cross section than any stable isotope of oxygen and its number density is twice as high in water as that of oxygen so that the effect is negligible. Furthermore the (n,α) reaction is a further undesirable result of an elevated concentration of heavier isotopes of oxygen. Therefore facilities which remove tritium from heavy water used in nuclear reactors often also remove or at least reduce the amount of heavier isotopes of oxygen.

Oxygen isotopes are also used to trace ocean composition and temperature which seafood is from.

Radioisotopes
The most common decay mode for isotopes lighter than the stable isotopes is β+ decay to nitrogen, and the most common mode after is β− decay to fluorine.

Oxygen-13
Oxygen-13 is an unstable isotope, with 8 protons and 5 neutrons. It has spin 3/2−, and half-life . Its parent nuclide is fluorine-14.

Oxygen-15
Oxygen-15 is a radioisotope, often used in positron emission tomography (PET). It can be used in, among other things, water for PET myocardial perfusion imaging and for brain imaging. It is produced through deuteron bombardment of nitrogen-14 using a cyclotron.

Oxygen-15 and nitrogen-13 are produced in air when gamma rays (for example from lightning) knock neutrons out of 16O and 14N:
 + γ →  + n
 + γ →  + n
The positron quickly annihilates with an electron, producing two gamma rays of about 511 keV. After a lightning bolt, this gamma radiation dies down with half-life 2 min, but these low-energy gamma rays go on average only about 90 metres through the air.

See also

 Dole effect

References

 
Oxygen
Oxygen